Telephone numbers in Yugoslavia consisted of a 3-digit area code followed by 6 digits. In Serbia, they mainly began with 1, 2 or 3, in Croatia 4 or 5, in Slovenia 6, Bosnia and Herzegovina 7, in Montenegro 8 and in Macedonia 9.

Yugoslavia's country calling code was +38.  On 1 October 1993, the +38 code was broken up and the first digit of each area code integrated into each country's new country code (for example, Macedonia's (now North Macedonia) country code became +389). The numbers were also changed in some countries. For example, Skopje's call prefix 091 became 02, so (091) 12 3456 became (02) 12 3456, and later (02) 312 3456.

Serbia and Montenegro, however, shared the +381 code until 2006, when Montenegro became independent and was assigned the +382 code. The +388 code was not used by Montenegro, but for the European Telephony Numbering Space. The +380 code was assigned to Ukraine. After negotiations, in 2015 the +383 code was assigned to Kosovo, which until then had used Serbian, Monegasque (+377) and Slovenian telephone networks. The +384 code remains unassigned.

Exchange codes could not begin 0 or 9 due to the trunk prefix and emergency numbers, respectively. Since most of the new systems have changed their emergency number to the European standard of 112 and changed their international call prefix to 00, nowadays exchange codes cannot begin 0 or 1.

Area codes

SR Bosnia and Herzegovina 

 70 - Jajce
 71 - Sarajevo
 72 - Zenica
 73 - Goražde
 74 - Doboj
 75 - Tuzla
 76 - Brčko
 77 - Bihać
 78 - Banja Luka
 79 - Prijedor
 80 - Livno
 88 - Mostar
 89 - Trebinje

SR Croatia 

 40 - Čakovec
 41 - Zagreb
 42 - Varaždin
 43 - Bjelovar
 44 - Sisak
 47 - Karlovac
 48 - Koprivnica
 49 - Krapina
 50 - Dubrovnik
 51 - Rijeka
 52 - Pula
 53 - Gospić
 54 - Osijek
 55 - Slavonski Brod
 56 - Vinkovci
 560 - Našice
 57 - Zadar
 58 - Split
 59 - Šibenik

SR Macedonia 

 901 - Kumanovo, Kratovo, Kriva Palanka
 902 - Radoviš, Strumica, Valandovo
 903 - Kočani
 904 - Strumica
 91 - Skopje
 92 - Probištip, Štip, Sveti Nikole
 93 - Gevgelija, Titov Veles
 94 - Gostivar
 95 - Kičevo
 96 - Struga, Resen, Ohrid, Debar
 97 - Demir Hisar, Bitola
 98 - Prilep

SR Montenegro 

 81 - Titograd, Danilovgrad, Kolašin
 82 - Kotor, Tivat
 83 - Nikšić, Plužine, Šavnik
 84 - Bijelo Polje, Mojkovac
 85 - Bar, Ulcinj
 86 - Budva, Cetinje
 871 - Andrijevica, Ivangrad, Plav, Rožaje
 872 - Pljevlja, Žabljak
 88 - Herceg Novi

SR Serbia 

 10 - Pirot
 11 - Belgrade
 12 - Požarevac
 14 - Valjevo
 15 - Šabac
 16 - Leskovac
 17 - Vranje
 18 - Niš
 19 - Zaječar
 20 - Novi Pazar
 26 - Smederevo
 27 - Prokuplje
 30 - Bor
 31 - Titovo Užice
 32 - Čačak
 33 - Prijepolje
 34 - Kragujevac
 35 - Jagodina
 36 - Kraljevo
 37 - Kruševac

SAP Vojvodina 
 13 - Vršac
 21 - Novi Sad
 22 - Sremska Mitrovica
 23 - Zrenjanin
 230 - Kikinda
 24 - Subotica
 25 - Sombor

SAP Kosovo 

 28 - Titova Mitrovica, Leposavić, Vučitrn, Srbica, Zvečan, Zubin Potok, North Mitrovica
 280 - Gnjilane, Vitina, Kosovska Kamenica, Parteš, Ranilug, Klokot
 29 - Prizren, Suva Reka, Dragaš, Mamuša, Mališevo
 290 - Uroševac, Đeneral Janković, Kačanik, Štrpce, Štimlje
 38 - Priština, Glogovac, Gračanica, Kosovo Polje, Lipljan, Novo Brdo, Obilić, Podujevo
 39 - Peć, Istok, Klina
 390 - Đakovica, Dečani, Junik, Orahovac

SR Slovenia 

 61 - Ljubljana
 601 - Trbovlje
 62 - Maribor
 602 - Ravne na Koroškem
 63 - Celje
 64 - Gorenjska (Kranj)
 65 - Nova Gorica
 66 - Koper
 67 - Postojna
 68 - Novo Mesto
 608 - Krško
 69 - Prekmurje (Murska Sobota)

Emergency/other numbers 
 92 - police
 93 - fire
 94 - ambulance
 985 - civil protection
 987 - AMSJ
 99 - international call prefix

References 

Yugoslavia